René G. J. Dercksen (born 11 December 1962) is a Dutch politician who has been a member of the Senate for the Party for Freedom from 9 June 2015 to 11 June 2019.

References

1962 births
Living people
Members of the Senate (Netherlands)
Party for Freedom politicians
21st-century Dutch politicians
Politicians from Rotterdam